The Roman Catholic Diocese of Świdnica is a diocese located in the city of Świdnica in the Ecclesiastical province of Wrocław in Poland. In 2013 about 28.7% of the dioceses population attended a church on Sundays regularly according to the church statistics.

Its St. Stanislaus and St. Wenceslaus Cathedral in Świdnica is listed as a Historic Monument of Poland.

History
The new diocese was created from the combination of 13 deaneries of the Archdiocese of Wroclaw and 8 deaneries of the Diocese of Legnica.

On February 24, 2004, John Paul II announced the election of Świdnica (from Nysa, Wałbrzych and Kłodzko) as the capital of the new diocese in Lower Silesia.

On March 19, 2008, Pope Benedict XVI appointed Adam Bałabuch, the first auxiliary bishop in the diocese.

On March 31, 2020 bishop Ignacy Dec retire and Pope Francis appointed Marek Mendyk as new diocesan bishop.

Leadership

 Bishops of Świdnica (Roman rite):
 Bishop Ignacy Dec (February 24, 2004 – March 31, 2020)
 Bishop Marek Mendyk (since April 24, 2020)
 Auxiliary bishop
 Adam Bałabuch (since March 19, 2008)

See also
Roman Catholicism in Poland

References

Sources
 GCatholic.org
 Catholic Hierarchy
 Diocese website

Roman Catholic dioceses in Poland
Roman Catholic Diocese of Swidnica
Christian organizations established in 2004
Roman Catholic dioceses and prelatures established in the 21st century
Roman Catholic Diocese of Świdnica